Yekaterina Vasilyevna Geltzer (November 2, 1876 – December 12, 1962) was a prima ballerina of the Bolshoi Ballet who danced in the theatre from 1898 to 1935. She was the daughter of the famous Russian dancer Vasily Geltzer.

She worked with Marius Petipa, Sergei Diaghilev, and Reinhold Glière. After the 1917 Russian Revolution, she helped to preserve the art of ballet in Russia. She was the first ballet dancer to receive the title of People's Artist of the RSFSR (1925). Her most famous post-revolutionary role was a Chinese dancer in the premiere of Glière's The Red Poppy. This production was staged by her husband Vasily Tikhomirov for her 50th birthday. In 1943, she was awarded a Stalin Prize and also received an Order of Lenin and an Order of the Red Banner of Labour.

After the divorce, Yekaterina Geltzer and Vasily Tikhomirov remained onstage partners. Once backstage at the Bolshoi Theatre, and well past the age of 60, Geltzer was heard telling her colleagues "help me get myself up en pointe, after that I know what to do."

Geltzer was once known to have a relationship with Gustaf Mannerheim, known as the Marshal of Finland. For years, there has been a rumor in Russia that Mannerheim and Geltzer would have secretly married, accidentally ended up apart, and jointly had a "son" Emil, whose descendants would still live in South America today, but Mannerheim scholars have only reacted negatively and characterized the claim just a "Russian fairy tale."

Gallery

See also
List of Russian ballet dancers

References

1876 births
1962 deaths
People's Artists of the RSFSR
Stalin Prize winners
Recipients of the Order of Lenin
Recipients of the Order of the Red Banner of Labour
Prima ballerinas
Ballerinas from the Russian Empire
Soviet ballerinas
Burials at Novodevichy Cemetery